Dennis O. "D. J." Wonnum Jr (born October 31, 1997) is an American football outside linebacker for the Minnesota Vikings of the National Football League (NFL). He played college football at South Carolina.

Early life and high school
Wonnum grew up in Stone Mountain, Georgia and attended Stephenson High School. As a senior, he was named All-Region after recording 38 tackles with 11 tackles for loss and 2.5 sacks. Wonnum initially committed to play college football at Iowa State before de-committing after a coaching change. He subsequently committed to attend Indiana before de-committing a second time and signing to play at South Carolina.

College career
Wonnum played in all of South Carolina's games as a true freshman, recording 32 tackles including 3.5 tackles for loss and 1.5 sacks. Wonnum was named a permanent team captain going into his sophomore year and finished the season with 57 tackles and led the team with 13.0 tackles for loss and 6.0 sacks. He injured his ankle during the Gamecocks' season opener as a junior, and only played in five games. He compiled 11 tackles, 3.5 tackles for loss and two sacks during the injury-shortened season. As a senior, Wonnum recorded 37 tackles with 9.5 tackles for loss and 4.5 sacks with three quarterback hurries, a forced fumble, one blocked kick, and an interception and was named second-team All-Southeastern Conference.

Professional career

Wonnum was selected by the Minnesota Vikings with the 117th overall pick in the fourth round of the 2020 NFL Draft.

In Week 4 against the Houston Texans, Wonnum recorded his first career sack on Deshaun Watson during the 31–23 win. 
In Week 8 against the Green Bay Packers, Wonnum recorded a strip sack on Aaron Rodgers which was recovered by teammate Eric Wilson late in the fourth quarter to secure a 28–22 Vikings' win.
In Week 10 against the Chicago Bears on Monday Night Football, Wonnum recorded a sack on Nick Foles during the 19–13 win.

Personal life
Wonnum's younger brother, Dylan, is a starting offensive lineman at South Carolina.

References

External links
South Carolina Gamecocks bio

1997 births
Living people
Players of American football from Georgia (U.S. state)
Sportspeople from DeKalb County, Georgia
People from Stone Mountain, Georgia
American football defensive ends
South Carolina Gamecocks football players
Minnesota Vikings players